Diplotychus is a monotypic genus of African crab spiders containing the single species, Diplotychus longulus. It was first described by Eugène Louis Simon in 1903, and is found on Madagascar.

See also
 List of Thomisidae species

References

Monotypic Araneomorphae genera
Spiders of Madagascar
Thomisidae